Norbert Theodore "Nobby" Tiemann (July 18, 1924 – June 19, 2012) was an American Republican politician from Wausa, Nebraska, and was the 32nd Governor of Nebraska, serving from 1967 to 1971.

Biography
Tiemann was born in Minden, Nebraska. He attended Campbell High School in Campbell, Nebraska, graduating in 1942. He served in the U.S. Army during World War II. After the war he attended the University of Nebraska-Lincoln where he was a member of the Society of Innocents and Beta Sigma Psi fraternity. Tiemann graduated in 1949 with a B.S. degree. He married Lorna L Bornholdt on July 19, 1950 and they had four children, Amy Eileen, Lorna Christine, Mary Catherine, and Norbert Jr.

Career
Tiemann then served in Korea from 1950-1952. After returning to the U.S., Tiemann served three terms as mayor of Wausa, Nebraska.

In 1966, Tiemann was elected Governor of Nebraska as a member of the Republican Party. He successfully pushed for a number of progressive changes, including the adoption of a new tax structure and of new programs of state financial aid to education, the expansion of the University of Nebraska, and the enactment of the state's first minimum wage law and of open-housing legislation. He served one term and was defeated in a bid for reelection by J. James Exon. The state centennial year coincided with his term and at the end of the centennial year, the legislature had passed 632 bills, a new state record.

Tiemann  was on the National Governors' Conference Executive Committee from 1968 to 1969. From June 1, 1973- January 1977 he served as Head of the U.S. Department of Transportation's Federal Highway Administration.

Death
Tiemann died at his home in Dallas, Texas on June 19, 2012, aged 87.

References

External links
 at the Nebraska State Historical Society
Norbert Theodore Tiemann entry at The Political Graveyard
National Governors Association

1924 births
2012 deaths
Republican Party governors of Nebraska
People from Minden, Nebraska
People from Knox County, Nebraska
Mayors of places in Nebraska
Nixon administration personnel
Administrators of the Federal Highway Administration
United States Army personnel of World War II
United States Army personnel of the Korean War
University of Nebraska–Lincoln alumni
Ford administration personnel
Carter administration personnel